Maureen Hiron (1942 – June 2022) was a British games designer and international bridge player. She is best known as a developer of over 60 board, card, dice, word and question and answer games, including the abstract strategy game Continuo. Her games were published through Hiron Games Ltd., which she founded with her husband in 1982 after retiring from teaching.

Personal life
Maureen Hiron was a teacher, head of the physical education department of an Inner London comprehensive school. She retired from teaching, aged 32, after a serious injury when a heavy metal air conditioner broke away and fell on her head while she was calling from a window to quieten some unruly children.

Hiron was a passionate bridge player, who participated in national and international championships. She was on the winning England team in both the  1974 and 1975 Lady Milne Trophy, the home countries internationals, and also represented Great Britain in the European Championships of 1974.

Through bridge she met Alan Hiron (1933–1999), the bridge correspondent of The Independent, and in 1990 the gold medalist of the inaugural World Championship Senior Pairs. The couple married in 1983.

In the early 1990s the Hirons moved to Southern Spain for the better climate. Alan died in Málaga on 7 June 1999 from Guillain–Barré syndrome. Maureen took over writing the bridge columns in The Independent and Irish Independent newspapers, and developed further games.

Hiron died in June 2022.

Game design

In 1982 the Hirons founded the games publishing company Hiron Games Ltd, initially to produce and market the game Continuo and later a stream of other games, such as Quizwrangle and Cavendish. Maureen invented the games and Alan was the tester and editor.  Continuo, launched on 1 April 1982, became Britain's best-selling game, with around 205,000 sets sold in the UK by the end of that year.

In 1984 Maureen and Alan Hiron were the subject of a 30-minute BBC TV documentary A Will to Win. Shortly afterwards Maureen was diagnosed with cancer and was admitted to the  Royal Marsden Hospital. There, using her fellow-patients as play-testers, she developed the game Chip In, which her company manufactured and used in the campaign to raise £25 million for the Royal Marsden, the world's first specialist cancer hospital. The Appeal President was Princess Diana, and the main backing newspaper was the Daily Star. Maureen was voted Londoner of the Year, in London Electricity's Brightening Up London campaign. The then Prime Minister, Margaret Thatcher, even took on Maureen and Alan at Chip In.

Bridge and writing
In 1993 Maureen and Alan competed in partnership at the European Union Bridge Senior Pairs in Portugal and won the bronze medal. Maureen and Alan wrote some beginners' bridge books together, and also quiz books - including The Ultimate Trivia Quiz Games Book, with over 10,000 questions, which reached No. 2 in the British Bestsellers list. (Non-fiction).  Maureen also wrote the questions for the first series of Channel 4's popular quiz show Fifteen to One and created puzzles for ITV's The Krypton Factor.

Selected publications
 1983: The 11+ Bridge Book (with Alan Hiron). Crowood
 1984, 1991: The Penguin Ultimate Trivia Quiz Game Book (with Alan Hiron)
 1985: Trivia Choice (with Alan Hiron & David Elias). Severn House
 1987: Bridge for Beginners (with Alan Hiron). Crowood
 1989: Beginning Bridge (with Alan Hiron).  Batsford
 1994: Easy Guide to Bridge (with Alan Hiron). Cadogan
 The Puffin Trivia Quiz Game Book (with Alan Hiron & David Elias)
 Beyond the Ultimate Trivia Quiz Game Book (with Alan Hiron & David Elias). Penguin
 Learn to play aBRIDGEd.  Out of the Box (USA)

Games

 1982: Continuo. Hiron Games, U.S.Games Systems. Schmidt Spiele
 1983: Quadwrangle. Hiron Games. 
 1983: Quizwrangle  Quizwrangle Add Pack 1; Quizwrangle Add Pack 2.  Hiron Games 
 1984: Double. Hiron Games
 1985: Seduxion. Hiron Games
 1985: Triangulo Continuo. Hiron Games
 1986: Cavendish. Pin International (Thailand)
 1986: Duo.  Ravensburger
 1986: The "A" Pack. Hiron Games
 1987: Top That!  Mattel
 1987: Croque. Hiron Games
 1987: Rainbow Rummy. Games Workshop
 1988: CHIP IN. AMIGO (Germany)
 1989: The Telebugs Game. Hiron Games
 1990: W.H.Smith Trivia. W.H.Smith Set 2 Trivia
 1991: 77. Schmidt Spiele
 1992: Black Rhino.  AGMuller (Swiss). Rhino.  ASS
 1993: Hexwrangle (with Graham Lipscombe)
 1993: Teddy's Party. U.S Games Systems.
 1994: Superroo AGMuller
 1995: Alles Oder Nichts (All or Nothing).  King (Germany)
 1996: Cambio  Pin International (Thailand). Lagoon
 1996: Corrrr-uption. Hiron Games
 1997: Hiron's Word Game
 1997: Dizzy Dice.  Promo special
 1997: Kniffel Duell  Schmidt Spiele
 1998: Z. Schmidt Spiele
 1998: Rhombo Continuo. Hiron Games. U.S.G.S (USA)
 1999: Stick Around. Great American Trading company
 2000: Di-Cross. Pin International (Thailand)
 2000: KEETOO (Casino game). Great American Trading Company
 2000: Trezo. Great American Trading Company
 2001: Zippy. David Westnedge. Playroom Entertainment
 2001: Cosmic Cows. Playroom Entertainment
 2001: Reaction Schmidt Spiele
 2002: Think Twice. David Westnedge. Playroom Entertainment
 2002: Qwitch.  Out of the Box. Mattel
 2003: Trinidad. Pin (Thailand)
 2003: Chekov. David Westnedge, Playroom Entertainment
 2003: Catz, Ratz & Batz.  David Westnedge, Playroom Entertainment
 2003: Tennis Dice.  Special Promo
 2003: Ping Pong Dice. Special Promo

 2004: Stratagem. Playroom Entertainment
 2004: Outfox. Great American Trading Company
 2004: Collide-O!  Playroom Entertainment
 2005: Top Dogs. Playroom Entertainment
 2005: Qwacky Wacky. Special promo
 2006: Mix-Up. Out of the Box
 2006: Hexago Continuo. U.S.G.S. David Westnedge
 2006: aBRIDGEd.  U.s.g.s.
 2007: Mr Congo. Schmidt Spiele
 2008: Slap 'n' Grab. Buffalo Games
 2008: On the Double. Playroom Entertainment
 2008: Zoooom. Martinex
 2009: Super Circles (with Ron & Caron Badkin) Out of the Box.  Vennerod.
 2009:  (published in German as Unter Spannung). Out of the Box
 2010: Papaya.  Special promotion
 2011: Tripolo. U.S.G.S.
 2011: Grabbelen. 999 Games
 2012: Grabolo.  Bonaparte (Czech Republic)
 2012: Dino Alarm.  HABA
 2012: Sectago Triangles. Sectago Rhomboids. Sectago Snowflakes
 2013: Grabolo Junior. Bonaparte
 2013: Words of Art. Playroom Entertainment
 2013: Triple 3. Ravensburger
 2014: Lichipolo 4.  Bonaparte
 2014: Pamatova.  Bonaparte
 2014: Grabolo 3D. Bonaparte.  John Adams
 2015: I Remember. Bonaparte
 2015: Carletto
 2016: MoesWords. Hiron Games
 2016: Keetoo (NOT casino game!). Bonaparte
 2017: Eye Catch. Inside Out. Bonaparte
 2018: Sneek Peek. Brainwaves - The Wise Whale. Kosmos. Thames & Kosmos
 2019: Colorolo. Bonaparte
 2019: KIVI Shapes. Martinex (Finland)
 2019: 7Ate9 Multi. Hoch Spannung. High Voltage.  Amigo (Germany)

Awards

 1995 Mensa Select Game: Continuo
 1995 Mensa Select Game: Duo
 1995 Parents Choice Gold Award: Teddy's Party
 1996 Mensa Select Game: Quadwrangle
 2018 Game of the Year: KIVI (Finland)
 2018 Game of the Year: Grabolo Junior (Hungary)
 2019 German Educational Game Award:  High Voltage
 2021 Academy of Adventure Gaming Arts and Design: inducted into Hall of Fame

References

External links

 Maureen Hiron in the game database Luding
 Maureen Hiron in the game database BoardGameGeek (English)

1942 births
2022 deaths
Board game designers
British game designers
Contract bridge writers
British women in business